The Ag-Pro 300 is a NASCAR Xfinity Series race held at Talladega Superspeedway, a 300-mile race. It is held annually before the NASCAR Cup Series race, the GEICO 500.

From its inception in 1992 through 1996, the race was held in the summer, as a support race to the Alabama 500. When that race moved to the fall, this race moved to the spring as a support race to the corresponding Cup race.

Large wrecks involving 20 or more cars have occurred a number of times in the history of the event, most notably in 2002, when 30 cars were involved in an accident on the backstretch on lap 14, with 19 of them knocked out at that point. The remainder of the race, following a long red-flag period, had little resemblance to typical restrictor plate racing as only two cars were within short distance at the checkered flag and only three finished on the lead lap.

Unique race distance
At its inception, the event debuted as a 117-lap,  event, the longest race on the Busch Series schedule. Automobile races in the United States measured in kilometers, especially those in NASCAR, are few. Through their history, ARCA races held at the track carried the more attractive and marketable "500" distance, even if it meant "500 kilometers" instead of miles (a custom also used at Riverside and Phoenix). The Busch Series race mimicked that precedent.

In 1998, fans complained about the use of kilometers, which was seen as a European custom. They argued that kilometers are rarely used in the United States, noting that the track measurement itself was still advertised in miles. Management changed the race to a  event from 1998 to 2001. The change shortened the race distance by just four laps.

In 2002, Aaron's assumed title sponsorship and returned the race to a 312-mile (≈500 kilometer) event. The race distance is only coincidental to that of 1992–1997. The distance, advertised unequivocally in miles this time, was set to reflect the sponsor's slogan ("3 ways to buy, 12 reasons to shop at Aaron's"). In 2015, the race returned to 300 miles.

Notable races
1993: The race lead changed 24 times at the stripe and several other times elsewhere as Dale Earnhardt battled Ernie Irvan and others.  In the final laps Michael Waltrip squeezed ahead of Earnhardt but fell to second; Irvan led a three-car draft from several seconds back to challenge for the win, but on the final lap was hit by Tracy Leslie and flew twenty feet off the ground before landing on all four wheels; Earnhardt chopped off Leslie in Turn Three and Randy LaJoie stormed three wide to finish second.
1994: The lead changed 30 times and was interrupted by only two cautions, none for any kind of accident, as Ken Schrader and Terry Labonte rocketed to the 1–2 finish with two laps to go.
1995: Ward Burton and Randy LaJoie both went for wild rides in separate accidents.  LaJoie's crash came when he was driving in relief of Tommy Houston; with eight laps to go Jeff Fuller spun out of fourth and LaJoie slid sideways then got launched into a tumble; behind them Robbie Reiser hit the wall, plowed through another car's nose and his throttle stuck open, sending him into a savage crash into the pit wall.
1996: In the final laps, amid a 20-car battle behind leader Greg Sacks, Todd Bodine was tagged, flew into the air, landed on his wheels, and pounded the inside wall.  Sacks held on for the win, his first in NASCAR since 1985.
1999: Terry Labonte and Joe Nemechek got into a last-lap drag race and crossed the finish line nose to nose.  It took nearly three minutes of examining the photo-finish video before NASCAR declared that Labonte had edged Nemecheck by inches at the stripe. It was Labonte's final Busch series win.
2001: Mike McLaughlin scores a surprising victory in the unsponsored #20 Joe Gibbs Racing Pontiac. McLaughlin won the race controversially, however, as he swerved his car below the yellow line to block other cars. The move drew the ire of veteran Jimmy Spencer, and NASCAR subsequently declared the double yellow line at Daytona and Talladega an out-of-bounds area.
2002: In what is probably the largest Big One in the Modern Era of NASCAR, Johnny Sauter flipped violently halfway down the backstretch and sparked a thirty-car melee on lap 14 including Greg Biffle, Shane Hmiel, Randy LaJoie, Joe Nemechek, Mike McLaughlin, Jay Sauter, Scott Riggs and others. Jason Keller, Stacy Compton and Kenny Wallace and a few drivers behind the wreck did not get damage. Michael Waltrip had a save close to colliding. On lap 46, Stacy Compton's decal ripped off his hood and got stuck at the base of the windshield, leaving a blank hood. With 8 laps to go, Kenny Wallace blew an engine and finished 9th, leaving three cars on the lead lap and two in contention to win. Jason Keller won the race, Stacy Compton came in second, and supposed start and park Tim Fedewa (driving a second car for Biagi Brothers Racing, whose main driver Mike Wallace was involved in the big one) came in third, half a lap down.
2004: NASCAR mandated the roof blade aerodynamic package for the Busch Series cars, the return of this package since it was run in Winston Cup in 2001.  Dale Earnhardt, Inc. racecars finished 1-2 as Martin Truex Jr. led the last 23 laps. A seven-car crash erupted in Turn One with two to go, ending the racing under yellow.  The lead changed 21 times.
2005: It started to rain at 3:30 AM Central Time in Talladega, Alabama. The race was originally going to be moved to Sunday after the GEICO 500 but the rain cleared up. The race started at 4:30 P.M., and the first pileup occurred on lap 17 when Mike Wallace and Casey Mears got together in front of the entire pack heading towards turn 1 and leaving the track blocked for everyone behind them. The wreck involved Kyle Busch,  points leader entering the day Carl Edwards, Michael Waltrip, Kenny Wallace, J. J. Yeley, Shane Hmiel, eventual winner Martin Truex Jr., and others.  A second rain delay occurred on lap 64, leaving the hopes of getting in the entire race in jeopardy. On lap 83, the 2nd pileup occurred when the 87 of Joe Nemechek came across the 20 of Denny Hamlin and Mears, sending Mears on to his roof, collecting several cars. The second-place point man Clint Bowyer was caught in three separate incidents, but still finished 19th. By race end, only 23 of the 43 cars finished the race, with 16 on the lead lap. The race ended at 8:20 P.M., with the track in near-darkness.  It was the first race in NASCAR's second-tier series to have aired on broadcast network television in prime-time, as the final 20 minutes of the Fox NASCAR broadcast entered prime-time television.
2007: The lead changed hands 36 times, a record that stood until 2011. Casey Mears led 22 laps until Tony Stewart grabbed the lead with two to go, but then Bobby Labonte drafted past for the win on the final lap.
2009: The lead changed 33 times among 15 drivers. Matt Kenseth flipped over during the race. In a near-photo finish David Ragan rocketed from fourth in the final mile as leaders Ryan Newman and Dale Earnhardt Jr. got together and Ragan squeezed to the win on the high side.
2010: due to a rain delay, this race was double-headed with the Sprint Cup race earlier in the day. Due to that race extended twelve laps due to three green-white-checker finish attempts (another first), there was only a half-hour break for drivers doing the doubleheader. Many drivers hence ended up doing over 840 miles of racing (combining the overall distances that the Sprint Cup and Nationwide races went). In a wild finish, Brad Keselowski stormed from the middle line of a three-abreast battle for the win, overtaking Sprint Cup race winner Kevin Harvick, while behind him, the Sprint Cup race's second-place finisher Jamie McMurray got spun out and Dennis Setzer flew into the catch fence in turn 4, in the spot where a nine car crash happened in the Sprint Cup race on lap 189. Carl Edwards also suffered from a crash in the early part of the event. Combined, the Sprint Cup and Nationwide races saw 121 lead changes (88 in the Sprint Cup, 33 in the Nationwide race).
2011: In the most frantic race in the history of the class in its various incarnations from Late Model Sportsman division to Busch Grand National to Nationwide Series, points leader Ricky Stenhouse Jr. hit the wall and caused a red flag, then on Lap 88 Michael Waltrip got turned into the backstretch wall by Jamie McMurray, who was attempting to draft pole sitter Elliott Sadler. The wreck ended up taking out sixteen cars and bringing out another red flag. Kyle Busch and Joey Logano finished 1-2 while Mike Wallace got blasted by Sadler and flipped on his roof once, crossing the finish line in 17th. The race also broke the record of the most lead changes in Nationwide Series history with 56.
2013: NASCAR's new Air Titan track-drying system got a powerful workout as the sanctioning body was able to dry the entire track in three hours despite heavy persistent rain. The first half saw over 20 lead changes and only two yellow flags.  After a ten-car crash erupted with 25 scheduled laps to go, NASCAR decided to cut 10 laps off the distance to 107 due to incoming darkness.  The race restarted on Lap 101 and seven laps to go but another yellow with two to go flew.  Despite protests from drivers about pending darkness NASCAR set up one lone attempt at a Green-White-Checkered finish. The race restarted with 108 laps completed, and Regan Smith rocketed from outside the top six into a three-abreast pass on Joey Logano and Kasey Kahne; a huge wreck in the tri-oval erupted coming to get the checkered flag and it took NASCAR a few minutes to decide the winner due to the caution, thinking Kasey Kahne won in a three-wide finish at the line. The tape showed Smith ahead at the moment of caution, and was declared the winner, coming just 7 laps short of the scheduled 117 lap distance.  The lead changed 47 times among 16 drivers.
2014: For 2014 NASCAR announced it would ban any form of push-drafting in the corners of restrictor plate races. The lead changed 27 times as Elliott Sadler, in a Joe Gibbs Racing Toyota, led 40 laps; Chris Buescher edged ahead of him at the white flag but Sadler drafted to the win on the final lap, his first in the Nationwide Series since 2012 and first with JGR.  Daytona winner, Regan Smith, led 20 laps en route to a close third.
2020: A second race in October called the Ag-Pro 300 was added to the schedule in support of the YellaWood 500. It marked the first time that the Xfinity Series raced at Talladega in the fall. Justin Haley got his 3rd straight restrictor-plate track win, joining Dale Earnhardt Jr. in that regard.

Past winners

2005, 2007, 2009–2013, 2016, 2018 and 2022: Races extended due to NASCAR overtime finishes.
2010: Race postponed from Saturday to Sunday due to rain.
2013: Race postponed same day due to rain; shortened to 107 laps due to darkness; extended to lap 110 due to NASCAR overtime.
2020: Race postponed from April 25 due to the COVID-19 pandemic.
2021: Race shortened due to rain.

Multiple winners (drivers)

Multiple winners (teams)

Manufacturer wins

References

External links

1992 establishments in Alabama
NASCAR Xfinity Series races
 
Recurring sporting events established in 1992
Annual sporting events in the United States